The WDF Asia-Pacific Cup is a darts tournament held biennially since 1974. The tournament consists of a team championship, a pairs championship and a singles championship. All events have a men's competition, and a women's competition. The most recent Asia-Pacific Cup was held in 2010, in Tokyo, Japan.

The tournament was originally known as the WDF Pacific Cup, but was renamed the Asia-Pacific Cup in 2000. It also initially featured teams from North America until the formation of the WDF Americas Cup in 2002.

List of tournaments

External links
 WDF Official Website

Darts tournaments
1974 establishments in Asia
1974 establishments in Oceania
Recurring sporting events established in 1974